Adelococcus alpestris is a species of fungus belonging to the family Adelococcaceae.

It is native to Europe and Northern America.

References

Verrucariales